Keminth Kubo (born 21 May 1999) is a Thai motorcycle racer, set to compete for the Yamaha VR46 Master Camp Team in the 2022 Moto2 World Championship.  He previously competed in the FIM CEV Moto2 European Championship from 2019 to 2021 with the same team.

Career statistics

Grand Prix motorcycle racing

By season

By class

Races by year
(key) (Races in bold indicate pole position; races in italics indicate fastest lap)

 Half points awarded as less than two thirds of the race distance (but at least three full laps) was completed.

References

1999 births
Living people
Keminth Kubo
Moto2 World Championship riders
Keminth Kubo
Keminth Kubo